The A68 autoroute is a  long motorway in southern France.  It connects Toulouse to  Albi.  It starts with a junction with the A61 and a junction with the A62.  It is also known as L’autoroute du Pastel.

Junctions

A61-A68 Junction between the A61 and the A68
01 (L'Union) km 2: Towns served: L'Union
Péage
02 Exchange A68-A680 km 10: A680 spur Towns served: to Gragnague and Verfeil
03 (Montastruc) km 13 Towns served: Montastruc-la-Conseillère
04 (Buzet) km 16 Towns served: Buzet-sur-Tarn
06 (Saint-Sulpice Lavaur) km 26 Towns served: Saint-Sulpice and  Lavaur
Service Area: Saint-Sulpice
07 (Rabastens) km 32 Towns served: Rabastens
08 (Lisle) km 41 Towns served: Lisle-sur-Tarn
Rest Area: Sanbatan/Les Issarts
09 (Gaillac) km 47 Towns served: Gaillac
10 (Cadalen) km 52 Towns served: Cadalen
11 (Marssac) km 61 Towns served: Marssac-sur-Tarn and Albi merges into the RN88.

Future
There are proposals to extend the motorway to St Etienne via Le Puy en Velay.

References

External links

 A68 Motorway in Saratlas

Autoroutes in France